Frederick Louis of Nassau-Ottweiler (13 November 1651 – 25 May 1728) was a member of the House of Nassau.

Biography
He was born in Ottweiler, the son of John Louis, Count of Nassau-Ottweiler and Countess Palatine Dorothea Catherine of Birkenfeld-Bischweiler.  He was count of Nassau-Ottweiler from 1680 until his death.  From 1721, he was also Count of Nassau-Idstein; from 1723 also Count of Nassau-Saarbrücken. When he died in Saarbrücken, without a male heir, his territories fell to his cousin Charles of Nassau-Usingen after his death in 1728.

Family
Frederick Louis married on 28 July 1680 with Countess Christiane von Ahlefeldt (1659–95), the daughter of Count Friedrich von Ahlefeldt and his first wife Countess Margarethe Dorothea zu Rantzau (1642-1665). They had eight daughters:
 Dorothea Friederike (1681–1691)
 Charlotte Marie (1684–1690)
 Christiane Charlotte (1685–1761), married first Charles Louis, Count of Nassau-Saarbrücken; secondly Frederick III, Landgrave of Hesse-Homburg
 Louise (1686–1773), married Charles, Wild- and Rhinegrave of Salm-Dhaun (1675–1733)
 Sophia Amalia (1688–1753), married Georg Friedrich, Burggraf von Kirchberg zu Hachenburg (1683–1749)
 Maria (1690–1714)
 Dorothea (1692–1740), married Walrad, Wild- and Rhinegrave of Salm-Dhaun (1686–1730)
 Elenore (1693–1693)

After Christiane's death, Frederick Louis married on 27 September 1697 Countess Louise Sophie of Hanau-Lichtenberg (11 April 1662 in Bischofsheim am Hohen Steg – 9 April 1751 in Ottweiler), the daughter of Johann Reinhard II of Hanau-Lichtenberg and Countess Palatine Anna Magdalena of Birkenfeld-Bischweiler. This marriage remained childless.

Ancestry

Counts of Nassau
House of Nassau
1651 births
1728 deaths
17th-century German people
18th-century German people
Counts of Nassau-Saarbrücken